William Felix Laurence Austin Munster (1849 – 11 April 1877) was an Irish Liberal Party politician.

He was elected as the Member of Parliament (MP) for Mallow at a by-election in 1872 but did not stand again at the next general election in 1874.

References

External links
 

1849 births
1877 deaths
Irish Liberal Party MPs
UK MPs 1868–1874
Members of the Parliament of the United Kingdom for County Cork constituencies (1801–1922)